Gladys Atieno Nyasuna Wanga (born 7 March 1981) is a Kenyan politician who is the current Governor of Homa Bay County. She is the first female Governor from the Western Region of the Country and one of the seven female governors elected during the 2022 Kenyan General Election. She served as the County Woman Representative of Homa Bay County from 2013 to 2022.

Background and education
Gladys grew up in a political family following closely the footsteps of her late father John Nyasuna, who at one point was a renowned councillor in Kisumu County, which was then known as Nyanza Province.

She obtained her Bachelor's Degree in Health Management from the Kenyatta University in 2004 and later on graduated from Kenyatta University in 2012 with a Master's Degree in Health Management. At Kenyatta University, she was the first female to participate and win an elective seat as the General Secretary of the Union of the Students.

Career 
In her early career life, Wanga was initially the Program Manager at the Kenyan Trust for African Rock Art formerly Trust for Africa Art before retaining the same role at the Liverpool VCT Care and Treatment. In 2013, Wanga ran for an elective seat for Women Representative at the Homa Bay County where she emerged victorious. In Parliament, Wanga was a member of Departmental Committee on Labour and Social Welfare in Kenya.

On 25 August 2022, she succeeded Cyprian Awiti as the second governor of Homa Bay County.

References

External links

 Mzalendo

Kenyatta University alumni
Living people
Kenyan women in politics
Kenyan women journalists
Kenyan journalists
1981 births